Caboc is a Scottish cream cheese, made with double cream or cream-enriched milk. This rennet-free cheese is formed into a log shape and rolled in toasted pinhead oatmeal, to be served with oatcakes or dry toast.

Description
The texture is smooth, slightly thicker and grainier than clotted cream, while the colour is a pale primrose yellow. The fat content is typically 67-69%, which is comparable with rich continental cream cheeses such as mascarpone. Historically, it was a cheese for the wealthy, unlike the similarly aged Crowdie, which is made from the by-products of skimming cream from milk and thus is considered a poor man's cheese.

History and legend
Caboc is Scotland's oldest cheese, dating from the 15th century in the Scottish Highlands. The cheese was first made by Mariota de Ile, the daughter of the chieftain of the Clan MacDonald of the Isles. At 12 years old, Mariota was in danger of being abducted by the Clan Campbell, who planned to marry her to one of their own and seize her lands. Mariota escaped to Ireland, where she learned how to make cheese. On her return, she passed the recipe to her daughter, who in turn passed it onto her daughter. The recipe is still a secret and has been handed down from mother to daughter ever since. The present maker is Mrs Suzannah Stone of Tain, who works with a team of eight local women and her cheese is sold under the seal of Highland Fine Cheeses Ltd.

According to legend, the tradition of coating Caboc in oatmeal started as an accident. A cattle herder stored the day's cheese in a box which he had used to carry his oatcakes earlier that day. Apparently, the oatmeal-coated cheese was enjoyed so much that from that day, Caboc has been made with an oaten coating.

References

External links

15th-century establishments in Scotland
15th-century introductions
Cow's-milk cheeses
Cream cheeses
Scottish cheeses